Pavel Tobiáš (born 10 January 1955) is a Czech football manager and former player.

Tobiáš coached several Czech football clubs, including Slavia Prague. Most often however, he led Dynamo České Budějovice, a club from his hometown.

His son, Kamil Tobiáš, is also a football manager.

External links
  SK Slavia Praha profile

1955 births
Living people
Sportspeople from České Budějovice
Czech footballers
Czechoslovak footballers
SK Dynamo České Budějovice players
Czech football managers
Czech First League managers
SK Dynamo České Budějovice managers
SK Slavia Prague managers
FC Zbrojovka Brno managers
1. FK Příbram managers
Association football defenders